Ana Carrascosa Zaragoza (born May 6, 1980) is a Spanish judoka who competes in the women's 52 kg category. She has twice been a bronze medalist at the Judo World Championships (2009, 2011). At European level, she has won the European championship once (2008), come second twice (2002 and 2009) and won one bronze medal (2011). At the 2008 Summer Olympics, she reached the third round where she lost to the eventual champion Xian Dongmei. She then lost to Kim Kyung-ok in the bronze medal match in the repechage. At the 2012 Summer Olympics, she was defeated in the first round by Marie Muller of Luxembourg.

Personal life 

She was born in Valencia, Spain. She attended the Sagrado Corazón HH. Maristas de Valencia and Mas Camarena where she began her playing career. She speaks French and Spanish.

References

External links
 
 

Spanish female judoka
1980 births
Living people
Olympic judoka of Spain
Judoka at the 2008 Summer Olympics
Judoka at the 2012 Summer Olympics
Sportspeople from Valencia
Mediterranean Games bronze medalists for Spain
Competitors at the 2009 Mediterranean Games
Mediterranean Games medalists in judo
20th-century Spanish women
21st-century Spanish women